Hillsboro Inlet in Pompano Beach, Florida is an inlet from the Atlantic Ocean that connects the Atlantic to the Intracoastal Waterway.

See also
Hillsboro Inlet Light

External links 
Hillsboro Inlet panorama

Bodies of water of Broward County, Florida
Inlets of Florida